The 20th American Society of Cinematographers Awards were held on February 26, 2006, honoring the best cinematographers of film and television in 2005.

Winners and nominees

Film
Outstanding Achievement in Cinematography in Theatrical Releases
 Dion Beebe – Memoirs of a Geisha
 Robert Elswit – Good Night, and Good Luck.
 Andrew Lesnie – King Kong
 Wally Pfister – Batman Begins
 Rodrigo Prieto – Brokeback Mountain

Television
Outstanding Achievement in Cinematography in Miniseries, Pilot, or Television Film
 Warm Springs – Robbie Greenberg
 Code Breakers – Thomas Del Ruth
 Faith of My Fathers – Bill Roe
 Into the West (Episode: "Wheel to the Stars") – Alan Caso
 Reefer Madness: The Movie Musical – Jan Kiesser

Outstanding Achievement in Cinematography in Episodic TV Series
 CSI: Crime Scene Investigation (Episode: "Who Shot Sherlock?") – Nathan Hope
 Carnivàle (Episode: "Los Moscos") – Jeffrey Jur
 Las Vegas (Episode: "Everything Old Is You Again") – John Newby
 Smallville (Episode: "Sacred") – Glen Winter
 Without a Trace (Episode: "Freefall") – John B. Aronson

References

2005
2005 film awards
2005 guild awards
2005 television awards
American